Douglas Noel Sargent (1907–1979) was the third Bishop of Selby.

He was educated at Watford Grammar School for Boys, King's College, Cambridge and  the London College of Divinity; and ordained in 1932. His first post was as Curate at Willian, Hertfordshire. Subsequently, he embarked on a long spell as a missionary in Sichuan Province at West China Union University. From 1961 until 1962 he was principal of the Church Missionary Society when he was elevated to the episcopate, a post he held until his retirement to York.

See also 
 Anglicanism in Sichuan

Notes

1907 births
People educated at Watford Grammar School for Boys
Alumni of King's College, Cambridge
Anglican missionaries in Sichuan
Bishops of Selby
20th-century Church of England bishops
1979 deaths
Alumni of the London College of Divinity